Covered with Ants is the sixth album by the Huntington Beach, California punk rock band Guttermouth, released in 2001 by Epitaph Records. It was the band's first album for Epitaph, having ended their contract with Nitro Records the previous year. The album continued the band's style of fast, abrasive punk rock with tongue-in-cheek humor and sarcastic lyrics, but found them experimenting with instruments they had not used before such as organ, banjo, and fiddle. A music video was filmed for the song "She's Got the Look." Covered With Ants would be the band's last recording with founding member James Nunn, and after his departure their music would take a different direction on 2002's Gusto.

Track listing
All songs written by Guttermouth
"That's Life" – 3:01
"Can I Borrow Some Ambition?" – 2:18
"Secure Horizons" – 2:50
"She's Got the Look" – 2:41
"Looking Good is All That Matters" – 2:11
"I'm Destroying the World" – 1:59
"Chug-a-Lug Night" – 3:38
"What You Like About Me" – 3:04
"I Won't See You in the Pit" – 1:09
"Black Enforcers" – 2:11
"Cram it Up Your Ass" – 6:36

In popular culture
A clean version of "I'm Destroying the World" was featured in the soundtrack for Tony Hawk's Pro Skater 3.

Personnel
Mark Adkins - vocals
Scott Sheldon - guitar
Eric "Derek" Davis - guitar
James "The Captain" Nunn - bass guitar
William Tyler "Ty" Smith - drums
Chris Colonnier - organ on "Cram it Up Your Ass"
Brantley Kearns - fiddle
Sascha Lazor (Mad Caddies) - banjo

Production
Jim Goodwin - recording, producer
Scott Sheldon - producer
Eric Davis - producer
Eddie Schreyer - mastering
Art and layout by Steve Rapp - art, layout design

References

Guttermouth albums
Epitaph Records albums
2001 albums